Péter Máté (born 15 November 1979 in Böhönye) is a Hungarian midfielder who currently plays for Zalaegerszegi TE.

External links
 HLSZ 

1979 births
Living people
Hungarian footballers
Association football midfielders
Kaposvári Rákóczi FC players
Zalaegerszegi TE players
Nemzeti Bajnokság I players